The John Regan American Legion Hall at 401 W. Idaho St. in Boise, Idaho was built in 1939.  It was designed by Tourtellotte & Hummel.  Its architecture is a hybrid of Moderne and Art Deco architecture.

It served historically as an American Legion clubhouse.  It was listed on the National Register of Historic Places in 1982 for its architecture.

The current tenants are TAG Historical Research (lower level) and ClearRock Capital.

References

Clubhouses on the National Register of Historic Places in Idaho
Art Deco architecture in Idaho
Moderne architecture in Idaho
Buildings and structures completed in 1939
Buildings and structures in Ada County, Idaho
American Legion buildings
National Register of Historic Places in Boise, Idaho